Таras Kоmpanichenkо (born 14 November 1969 in Kyiv, Ukrainian SSR) is a Ukrainian recording artist, kobzar, bandurist, lutenist, lira player, composer and singer-songwriter. He is an active member of the Kobzarskyi Tsekh (literally "Kobzar guild") as well as of the Early Music ensembles "Chorea Kozacka" and "Sarmatica". He was an active participant in the Orange Revolution that took place in Ukraine from November 2004 to January 2005 as well as Euromaidan 2013–2014. He is laureate of the Vasyl Stus Prize.

Originally trained as a painter and an art historian, he gave up this profession in favor of music. In the wake of Russia launching a full-scale invasion of Ukraine, he took up arms and joined the 241st Territorial Defense Brigade.

References

External links
Спадкоємець українських мудреців – інтерв'ю
Інтерв`ю з Тарасом Компаніченком про перспективи традиційного музикування на автентичних співоцьких інструментах

1969 births
Living people
Torbanists
Bandurists
Ukrainian singer-songwriters
Ukrainian composers
Historicist composers
Hurdy-gurdy players
Ukrainian lutenists
Recipients of the Vasyl Stus Prize
Musicians from Kyiv
Kobzars
Performers of early music
Recipients of the title of Merited Artist of Ukraine